Barr Lake State Park is a Colorado state park established in 1977 in Adams County near Brighton, Colorado, USA. The  park has  of trails, including an  trail that circles Barr Lake. Fishing and boating are allowed in the northern half of the park. The southern half is a wildlife refuge, with several wildlife viewing stations and a nature center. Numerous bald eagles spend the winter at Barr Lake and one pair nests every year. The park is popular with birders; over 350 species have been observed.

The headquarters of the Bird Conservancy of the Rockies is inside the park on the northwest side of the lake.

Barr Lake is fed by the Burlington Ditch, which is diverted from the South Platte River.

The namesake Barr Lake derives its name from one Mr. Barr, a railroad official.

References

External links
 U.S. Geological Survey Map at the U.S. Geological Survey Map Website. Retrieved December 5, 2022.

Protected areas of Adams County, Colorado
State parks of Colorado
Protected areas established in 1977
Nature centers in Colorado
1977 establishments in Colorado